Adam Brett Walker II (born October 18, 1991) is an American professional baseball outfielder for the Yomiuri Giants of Nippon Professional Baseball (NPB). He was drafted by the Minnesota Twins in the 3rd round of the 2012 Major League Baseball draft. Walker played college baseball at Jacksonville University.

Career

Minnesota Twins
Walker was drafted in the 3rd round, 97th overall, by the Minnesota Twins in the 2012 Major League Baseball Draft. He signed with the Twins on June 17, receiving a signing bonus of $490,400. Walker made his professional debut for the rookie-level Elizabethton Twins and hit 14 home runs in 58 games. In 2013, Walker played in 129 games for the Single-A Cedar Rapids Kernels, batting .278/.319/.526 with 27 home runs and 109 runs batted in. He played for the High-A Fort Myers Miracle the following year, posting a slash of .246/.307/.436 with 25 home runs and 94 runs batted in during in 132 contests. In 2015, Walker played for the Double-A Chattanooga Lookouts, hitting .239/.309/.498 with a career-high 31 home runs and 106 runs batted in during 133 games. After the 2015 season, Walker was ranked #10 on Minnesota's top 30 prospects list. On November 20, 2015, the Twins added Walker to the 40-man roster to protect him from the Rule 5 draft. Walker spent the 2016 campaign with the Triple-A Rochester Red Wings, hitting .243/.305/.479 with 27 home runs and 75 runs batted in across 132 games for the team.

Atlanta Braves
On November 18, 2016, Walker was claimed off waivers by the Milwaukee Brewers. On November 28, the Brewers designated Walker for assignment. On December 2, Walker was claimed off waivers by the Baltimore Orioles. On January 20, 2017, the Orioles designated Walker for assignment. On January 26, Walker was claimed off waivers by the Atlanta Braves. On January 31, he was outrighted off of the 40-man roster. Walker began 2017 with the Triple-A Gwinnett Braves, but hit just .128/.205/.282 in 10 games before he was demoted to the Double-A Mississippi Braves. Walker hit .122/.182/.388 in 14 contests before he was released by the Braves organization on May 9.

Baltimore Orioles
On May 10, 2017, Walker signed a minor league contract with the Baltimore Orioles organization. Walker was assigned to the Double-A Bowie Baysox and in 12 games hit .426/.449/.915 with 6 home runs and 12 runs batted in for the team before he was promoted to the Triple-A Norfolk Tides. After limping to an .090/.090/.164 line in 18 games for Norfolk, he was released by the Orioles on July 23.

Cincinnati Reds
On August 4, 2017, Walker signed a minor league contract with the Cincinnati Reds organization. He was assigned to the Triple-A Louisville Bats, where he would spend the rest of the season, hitting .207/.275/.370 in 25 appearances. He elected free agency on November 6, 2017.

Kansas City T-Bones
On April 23, 2018, Walker signed with the Kansas City T-Bones of the American Association of Professional Baseball Walker ended up playing in 3 games for the T-Bones, getting 2 hits in 11 at-bats.

Washington Nationals
On May 23, 2018, Walker signed a minor league deal with the Washington Nationals. Walker was assigned to the Double-A Harrisburg Senators and posted a slash of .200/.324/.383 in 41 contests. He elected free agency on November 2, 2018.

Milwaukee Milkmen
On April 2, 2019, Walker signed with the Milwaukee Milkmen of the American Association. He played in 98 games for the Milkmen in 2019, carrying a .249/.299/.478 batting mark. On February 12, 2020, Walker re-signed with the Milkmen for the 2020 season. Walker hit .268/.320/.609 with 22 home runs and 50 runs batted in across in 57 games with the Milkmen and would go on to win the American Association championship with the team. Following the season, Walker was named the American Association player of the year.

In 2021, Walker played in 101 games for the Milkmen, and clubbed a league-leading 33 home runs with 101 runs batted in and a slash of .320/.369/.636. Following the year, Walker was named the American Association player of the year for the second consecutive season, becoming the first player in American Association history to be win the Most Valuable Player award in back-to-back seasons.

Yomiuri Giants
On December 15, 2021, Walker signed with the Yomiuri Giants of Nippon Professional Baseball (NPB) for the 2022 season. He made his NPB debut on March 26, 2022.

Personal life
His father, Adam Walker, played in the National Football League (NFL) for the Minnesota Vikings in 1987.

References

External links

1991 births
Living people
People from Milwaukee
African-American baseball players
Baseball players from Wisconsin
American expatriate baseball players in Japan
Yomiuri Giants players
Elizabethton Twins players
Cedar Rapids Kernels players
Fort Myers Miracle players
Chattanooga Lookouts players
Rochester Red Wings players
Mississippi Braves players
Bowie Baysox players
Norfolk Tides players
Louisville Bats players
Harrisburg Senators players
Gwinnett Braves players
Sportspeople from Milwaukee
Jacksonville Dolphins baseball players
Kansas City T-Bones players
Milwaukee Milkmen players
Scottsdale Scorpions players